Alkalihalobacillus nanhaiisediminis is a Gram-positive and rod-shaped bacterium from the genus of Alkalihalobacillus which has been isolated from sediments from the South China Sea.

References

Bacillaceae
Bacteria described in 2011